"Across the Bridge" is a 1938 short story by Graham Greene. It was published in the 1947 collection Nineteen Stories. The work was filmed in 1957, starring Rod Steiger, and as Double Take in 2001.

Plot
The story is told first-person by an unnamed narrator who reveals little about himself, other than that he is a wandering stranger stranded in a small Mexican border village. The narrator is fascinated by Joseph Calloway, a famous con-man believed to be extremely wealthy, who is in the Mexican village on the run from the law. The narrator claims to feel sympathy not for Calloway but for Calloway's dog, an ugly creature that he repeatedly kicks. Two detectives enter the village looking for Calloway, but though they have several conversations with the con-man, they never realize he is their quarry. Meanwhile, Calloway, overcome by homesickness for America, manages to get himself secreted across the border. In the end, Calloway is killed by the detectives' car, apparently while trying to save the dog's life and the truth about the human experience isn't revealed. The narrator claims to find something comic in the end of Calloway's life. He writes "Death doesn't change comedy to tragedy." The reader is left to evaluate the meaning of this statement and to weigh both the tragic and the comic elements of the story.

The story builds its tension on dramatic irony, with the narrator knowing more about the story than both Calloway and the detectives, and the Mexican natives knowing more than the narrator, who says, "Any man doing dusty business in any of the wooden booths in the town is better fitted by long observation to tell Mr Calloway's tale than I am."

References

1938 short stories
Short stories by Graham Greene
Short stories adapted into films
Films shot at Pinewood Studios